R. Jay Turner (December 19, 1934 - May 12, 2018) was a widely cited academic sociologist who uses demographic techniques to research epidemiology. He was a professor of sociology and psychiatry at Vanderbilt University, and he was affiliated with the Center for Research on Health Disparities. He also maintained the title of Emeritus Professor of Sociology and Epidemiology and a Professor of Psychology at Florida State University. While at FSU he was affiliated with the Center for Demography and Population Health.

His main research contributions include:  stress and mental health/substance use problems; psychiatric epidemiology; and risk and protective factors for mental health and substance use problems. He has been the lead investigator on 19 federal grants in the United States and Canada.

References

External links
 
 
 ISI High-Cited faculty profile

Syracuse University alumni
Florida State University faculty
American epidemiologists
2018 deaths
1934 births
American sociologists